The Daimler CL.I was a prototype two-seat fighter built in Germany during World War I.

Design and development
The CL.I was built by the Daimler Motorengesellschaft Werke with the internal designation L8. It first flew in 1917 but did not enter production, although in 1919, it was marketed for export to the Chilean Air Force.

Specifications

References

Further reading

 

1910s German fighter aircraft
L8
Single-engined tractor aircraft
Aircraft first flown in 1917